Both cricket and rugby are played at the 1,200-capacity John Hunter Grounds in Limavady, Northern Ireland.

Team history
Rugby was first played in Limavady in the year 1922. On 14 September 1968 both cricket and rugby clubs in Limavady were merged. This was marked by an opening at the John Hunter Grounds, Limavady as the club's permanent home. The day is always be remembered for a cricket match between the full West Indies side led by the great Sir Gary Sobers playing against an Ireland XV, and a Rugby game between an Irish XV led by Noel Murphy (former British Lions coach).

International
In 2004 it hosted a 3-day match, Ireland v MCC, and in the same year they hosted a one-day match, Ireland v Bangladesh.

External links
Official website
More information about Limavady Cricket Club

Cricket grounds in Northern Ireland
Sports venues in County Londonderry
Rugby union stadiums in Ireland